Avernes is a commune in the Val-d'Oise department in Île-de-France in northern France. On 1 January 2018, the former commune of Gadancourt was merged into Avernes.

Population

Filming a movie in Avernes in 1975

In the Brasserie "La T'Avernes" (56 Grande Rue, 95450 Avernes) was shot a scene on the terrace in the movie “2 Suédoises à Paris” in the summer of 1975.

New history of the Moulin des Champs 95450 Avernes
The Moulin des Champs in Avernes has been used since 1975 as a set for filming the Classement X films. The following films were shot there:

    Les week-ends d'un couple pervers” (version - 70 min) "Introductions" (original French Title) 83 min. 11.03.1976 Visa of Controle № 44662. Date de sortie en salle: 07.04.1976
    “2 Swedish Girls in Paris” (version - 91 min) "Pornographie Suedoise” (original French Title) 66 min. 09.03.1976 Visa of Controle № 44766. RELEASE DATE: 11.08.1976
    "Parties raides” (original French Title) 86 min. 01.12.1976 Visa of Controle № 46338. RELEASE DATE: 01.12.1976
    “Couple débutant cherche couple initié” (original French Title) 75 min. 22.12.1976 Visa of Controle № 46419. RELEASE DATE: 15.12.1976
    "La nymphomane perverse” (original French Title) 80 min. 27.12.1976 Visa of Controle № 46421. RELEASE DATE: 26.01.1977
    “La Marquise von Porno” (original French Title) 75 min. 27.01.1977 Visa of Controle № 46420. RELEASE DATE: 19.01.1977
    "Les Plaisirs fous” (version) “Confessions Perverses“ (original French Title) 88 min. 08.07.1977 Visa of Controle № 46782. RELEASE DATE: 20.07.1977
    “Langues cochonnes“ (original French Title) 88 min. 11.08.1978 Visa of Controle № 48145. RELEASE DATE in France: 01.11.1978
    "Le Sexe à la bouche” (original French Title) 89 min. 07.09.1977 Visa of Controle № 47069. RELEASE DATE: 31.08.1977

See also
Communes of the Val-d'Oise department

References

External links

Association of Mayors of the Val d'Oise 

Communes of Val-d'Oise